Tasuj (also Romanized as Ţasūj and Tasooj; also known as Tasūch) is a village in Tasuj Rural District, in the Central District of Kavar County, Fars Province, Iran. At the 2006 census, its population was 5,814, in 1,243 families.

References 

Populated places in Kavar County